Joran Pot (born 20 January 1989 in Heino) was a Dutch professional footballer who played as a midfielder for RBC Roosendaal, FC Zwolle and Go Ahead Eagles. He currently coaches the women of PEC Zwolle.

External links
 Voetbal International profile 

1989 births
Living people
Dutch footballers
RBC Roosendaal players
PEC Zwolle players
Go Ahead Eagles players
Eerste Divisie players
People from Raalte
Association football midfielders
Footballers from Overijssel